Luigi Fontana, M.D., PhD, FRACP (born April 22, 1969) is an internationally recognized physician scientist who studies healthy longevity, with a focus on calorie restriction, endurance exercise and metabolism. He is currently the Leonard P Ullmann Chair in Translational Metabolic Health at the Charles Perkins Centre, where he directs the Healthy Longevity Research and Clinical Program. He is also a Professor of Medicine and Nutrition in the Faculty of Medicine and Health at the University of Sydney and a Clinical Academic in the Department of Endocrinology at the Royal Prince Alfred Hospital in Sydney, Australia. Fontana is an Adjunct Professor of Medicine at Washington University School of Medicine.

Education
Fontana received his medical training at the University of Verona in Italy and graduated with honors in 1994. After two years as intern and resident at the University of Verona Medical School, Fontana joined the Laboratory of Clinical Pharmacology at the King's College School of Medicine, University of London in 1997. He returned to University of Verona in 1998 to become Chief Medical Resident in Internal and Emergency Medicine and graduated in 1999. In 2004 he completed his PhD in Metabolism at University of Padova School of Medicine in Italy.

Honors
He is the recipient of three prestigious awards: the 2009 American Federation for Aging Research (AFAR) Breakthroughs in Gerontology Award, the 2011 Glenn Award for Research in Biological Mechanisms of Aging, and the 2016 Vincent Cristofalo Award of the American Federation for Aging Research. He was a Scientific Member of the Board of Directors of the American Aging Association, and is the Editor in Chief of the scientific journal "Nutrition and Healthy Aging".

Research
His research has focused primarily on dietary restriction and its effects on aging and the prevention of age-associated chronic disease.  Around 2012 he started a long-term study of 45 members of the Calorie Restriction Society and age-matched endurance athletes with the intention of tracking their health for around 12 years each.  He also has been a primary investigator in the CALERIE trial, which started in 2007, in which people were placed on a diet with 25% fewer calories and received regular counseling to help them remain on it. Because of his pioneering studies on the metabolic and molecular effects of dietary restriction, he is now considered to be one of the world-leading scientists in the field of nutrition and healthy aging in humans.  His studies have opened a new area of nutrition-related research that holds tremendous promise for the prevention of age-related chronic diseases and for the understanding of the biology of human aging.

Dr. Fontana and his laboratory are currently focused on understanding the role of specific nutrition (e.g. calorie restriction, fasting, protein restriction, plant-based diet) and aerobic exercise interventions in preventing and treating multiple age-related diseases that share a common metabolic substrate. This new approach is based on growing evidence from the “biology of ageing” field showing that targeting well-characterized metabolic and molecular pathways can inhibit the accumulation of cellular and tissue damage, and dramatically extend healthspan and influence the clinical progression of multiple chronic conditions. Dr. Fontana's research program employs state-of-the-art whole-body physiological and tissue-specific molecular techniques to well-designed randomized clinical trials to evaluate the clinical, metabolic, and molecular effects of nutritional and other lifestyle manipulations.

Nutrition and environmental health
Professor Fontana has also a keen interest in the role of nutrition in promoting environmental health. In 2013, he wrote a perspective article with Daniel Kammen on the beneficial role of efficient use of energy and food in promoting human, environmental, and planetary health, and sustainable economic development. The current global food system is not only responsible for the growing pandemic of obesity, malnutrition and chronic disease, but also for over 30% of greenhouse-gas emissions, widespread (soil, water, air) pollution, damage to ecosystems, and loss of biodiversity.
Fontana and colleagues believe that it is possible to substantially enhance human and environmental health, societal wealth and well-being, but this requires a profound transformation in the way we live, and a new environment-centered industrial and economic system. They argue that most of the knowledge and technology to transform the world and begin a new industrial revolution already exist today. We only need to relinquish the idea of producing more energy, food, and other products at lower cost in favor of a new paradigm that opts for less but high-quality energy, food and materials for a healthier life and environment. They also claim that “both individual and societal wealth, happiness, and well-being do not depend merely on the acquisition of material goods and on economic growth, but are powered by our physical and psychological health, the quality of life and the richness of our social relationships, and foremost by the health of the environment that supports all life on earth, our Natural Capital that must be preserved”.

Publications
As of 2019 his most-cited and influential papers were:

Books
Berrino F, Fontana L. La Grande Via: Nutrizione, Movimento, Meditazione. Mondadori Editori, 2017.
Fontana L, Vittorio Fusari. La felicità ha il sapore della salute. Slow Food Editore, 2018.
Fontana L, Vittorio Fusari. La table de longue vie. Éditions du Rouergue, 2019.
Fontana L. The Path to Longevity. Hardie Grant Publishing, 2020.

References

External links
University of Sydney Homepage
Google Scholar Luigi Fontana
Linkedin Luigi Fontana

Living people
Biogerontologists
Academic staff of the University of Sydney
1969 births
Washington University School of Medicine faculty